Mike Hilgers (born October 25, 1978) is an American businessman, lawyer and politician who is the  Nebraska Attorney General. He previously served as a Republican member of the Nebraska Legislature, representing the 21st district from 2017 to 2023. On January 6, 2021, Hilgers was elected as Speaker of the Nebraska Legislature.

Early life
Hilgers was born in Omaha, Nebraska. He graduated from Omaha Creighton Preparatory School in 1997. He obtained an economics degree from Baylor University in 2001. He lives in Lincoln, Nebraska, with his wife Heather, and four children – Alice, Elsie, Clara Jane, and Michael Jr.

Legal and business career
Hilgers graduated from the University of Chicago Law School, where he was an editor on the Law Review.  After graduating from law school, He served as a judicial clerk for the Edith Brown Clement, senior judge of the United States Court of Appeals for the Fifth Circuit. He worked at the International Intellectual Property Law firm, and Fish & Richardson P.C., before moving back home to Lincoln.

Hilgers is the founder of the law firm Hilgers Graben, which he started building in his basement. The law firm was named to Inc. magazine's list of fastest 5000 growing companies in the country three years in a row. In 2018 the magazine named it the fastest growing private company in Lincoln.

Political career

2020 campaign
In 2020, Hilgers ran for re-election to the State Legislature, District 21. He won the primary campaign with 5,150 votes (59.1%) ahead of Brodey Weber's 2,379 votes (27.3%) and Joseph Couch's 1,184 votes (13.6%). He won re-election with 10,157 votes (55%) to Brodey Weber's 8,325 (45%).

2016 campaign
In 2016, Hilgers ran for election to the State Legislature, District 21. He won the primary campaign with 3,053 votes (53.4%) ahead of Larry Scherer's 1,936 votes (33.8%) and Rick Vest's 732 votes (12.8%). He won the general election campaign with 8,588 votes (56.7%) compared to Larry Scherer's 6,567 votes (43.3%).

2014 campaign
In 2014, Hilgers ran for election to be Nebraska's Attorney General. He lost the primary campaign with 43,371 votes (22.9%) behind Doug Peterson's 67,578 votes (35.6%) and Brian Buecher's 48,316 votes (25.5%) and ahead of Pete Pirsch's 30,321 votes (16%).

2012 campaign
In 2012, Hilgers challenged incumbent Senator Ken Haar for the State Legislature, District 21. He came in second in the primary campaign with 2,238 votes (46.2%) behind Ken Haar's 2,471 votes (51%) and ahead of Bryan C. Ifland's 134 votes (2.8%). Hilgers lost the general election with 6,784 votes (49.7%), 85 votes behind Ken Haar's 6,869 votes (50.3%).

Legislative career

Speaker (107th Legislature) 
Hilgers was elected Speaker for the 107th Legislature by acclamation. He was the first Speaker from Lincoln since 1977–78.

Chairman of the Executive Board of the Legislative Council (106th Legislature) 
Hilgers was elected the Chairman of the executive board of the Legislative Council for the 106th Legislature.

Chairman of the Rules Committee (105th Legislature) 
Hilgers was elected the Chairman of the Rules Committee for the 105th Legislature.

Committee assignments 
For the 105th and 106th Legislatures, Hilgers was a member of the Transportation and Telecommunications Committee as well as the Government, Military, and Veterans Affairs Committee.

For the 107th Legislature, he serves as a member of the executive board, Legislative Performance Audit, Planning, and Reference Committees. As speaker, he is an ex officio member of the Rules Committee.

He also served as the Chairman of the State Tourism and Recreation Water Access Resources (STAR WARS) Special Committee, created by LB406, which was intended to study transformative water and tourism projects around the state of Nebraska.

Legislative accomplishments

Personal bills and priorities

Expedited construction of the South Beltway (LB616) 
In 2019, Hilgers introduced and prioritized LB616, a bill to accelerate construction of the “long-awaited South Beltway, reducing its completion timetable from eight to three years.” In addition to accelerating the timetable for completion the bill was estimated to save $25 million in construction costs. The bill passed 48–0. As of May 2021, the South Beltway was on track to be finished on its expedited schedule.

Expansion of direct primary care (LB1119) 
In 2018, he prioritized LB1119, Senator Riepe's bill to expand direct primary care in Nebraska. The bill passed on final reading.

Expansion of broadband (LB388) 
In 2021, he prioritized LB388, a bill introduced at the request of Governor Ricketts to expand high-speed broadband to 30,000 households around the State of Nebraska. The bill passed 49–0.

Streamlining road construction (LB271) 
Hilgers introduced in 2017 LB271, which cut red tape in the construction of certain larger highway construction projects. LB271 was estimated to cut $19 million annually by allowing the state to take over certain environmental reviews. The Norfolk Daily News called it a “wise idea” for roads construction. The bill was prioritized by fellow Lincoln senator, Senator Geist, and passed 48–0.

References

|-

|-

|-

 

1978 births
21st-century American politicians
Living people
Nebraska Attorneys General
Republican Party Nebraska state senators
Speakers of the Nebraska Legislature